A peace conference is a diplomatic meeting where representatives of certain states, armies, or other warring parties converge to end hostilities and sign a peace treaty.

Peace conference may also refer to:

International Peace Conference, anti-war conference held on December 10, 2005
Peace Conference of 1861, conference on the American Civil War
Hague Conventions of 1899 and 1907, 1899 conference in the Hague

See also
Paris Peace Conference (disambiguation)
Peace congress